Year 915 (CMXV) was a common year starting on Sunday (link will display the full calendar) of the Julian calendar.

Events 
 By place 
 Europe 
 Summer – Battle of Garigliano: The Christian League, personally led by Pope John X, lays siege to Garigliano (a fortified Arab camp in the area of Minturno), which is blockaded from the sea by the Byzantine navy. After three months of siege, plagued by hunger, the Saracens decide to break out of Garigliano and find their way back to Sicily by any means possible. Christian hunting parties fall on the fleeing Arabs, and all are captured and executed.
 July – The Magyars (Hungarians), led by Zoltán, only son of the late Grand Prince Árpád, attack Swabia, Franconia and Saxony. Small units penetrate as far as Bremen, burning the city.

 By topic 
 Religion 
 December 3 – John X crowns the Italian sovereign Berengar I as the Holy Roman Emperor in Rome. Berengar returns to northern Italy, where Friuli is threatened by the Hungarians.

Births 
 January 13 – Al-Hakam II, Umayyad caliph (d. 976)
 Abu Shakur Balkhi, Persian poet
 Adalbert I, Frankish nobleman (approximate date)
 Al-Mutanabbi, Muslim poet (d. 965)
 Boleslaus I, duke of Bohemia (approximate date)
 Burchard III, Frankish nobleman (d. 973)
 Hasdai ibn Shaprut, Jewish diplomat (d. 970)
 Sunifred II, Frankish nobleman (d. 968)
 William III, Frankish nobleman (d. 963)

Deaths 
 April 23 – Yang Shihou, Chinese general
 November 4 – Zhang, Chinese empress (b. 892)
 Abu Salih Mansur, Samanid governor
 Adalbert II, Lombard nobleman
 Al-Nasa'i, Muslim scholar and hadith compiler
 Bi'dah al-Kabirah, was a songstress, and had been a slave of Arib. She died on 10 July 915. Abu Bakr ibn al-Muhtadi led the funeral prayers. She was also concubine of Abbasid caliph Al-Mamūn (r. 813–833)
 Bertila of Spoleto, queen of Italy
 Cutheard, bishop of Lindisfarne
 Domnall mac Áeda, king of Ailech (Ireland)
 Gonzalo Fernandez, count of Castile
 Gregory IV, duke of Naples
 Jing Hao, Chinese painter 
 Leoluca, Sicilian abbot (approximate date)
 Li Yanlu, Chinese warlord
 Ratbod, archbishop of Trier
 Reginar I, Frankish nobleman
 Regino of Prüm, German abbot
 Spytihněv I, duke of Bohemia 
 Sunyer II, Frankish nobleman
 Tuotilo, German composer (approximate date)

References